In the United States, a charter city is a city in which the governing system is defined by the city's own charter document rather than solely by general law. In states where city charters are allowed by law, a city can adopt or modify its organizing charter by decision of its administration by the way established in the charter. These cities may be administered predominantly by residents or through a third-party management structure, because a charter gives a city the flexibility to choose novel types of government structure. Depending on the state, all cities, no cities, or some cities may be charter cities.

California 
For example, in California, cities which have not adopted a charter are organized by state law. Such a city is called a General Law City (or a Code City), which will be managed by a 5-member city council.  A city organized under a charter may choose different systems, including the "strong mayor" or "city manager" forms of government.  As of 21 January 2020, 125 of California's 478 cities are charter cities. A few  examples include Los Angeles, San Francisco, San José, and the capital, Sacramento.

Texas
Under Texas law, unless a city charter is passed, cities have only those powers granted under the Texas Constitution and the general laws of the state, and no more.

Once a city reaches a population of 5,000, the voters may petition an election for a city charter.  If the charter is approved by the voters, the city is governed under home rule status, which allows the city to pass any ordinance which is "not inconsistent" with either the Texas Constitution or the general laws of the state.  This has caused some turmoil between cities seeking to pass laws and the Legislature attempting to keep them from doing so; examples include plastic bag bans (or plastic bag fees) and bans on oil and gas drilling within city limits.  The city may retain home rule status even if the population subsequently falls below 5,000.

Texas law does not allow counties or special districts (other than school districts) to operate under a charter; their powers are strictly limited to those under the Texas Constitution and general law.  School districts may petition for a charter; however, no school district has done so.

See also 
 City-state
 Dillon's Rule
 Free imperial city
 Home rule

References

Further reading 
 Kemp, Roger L., "Model Government Charters: A City, County, Regional, State, and Federal Handbook," McFarland and Co., Inc., Publisher, Jefferson, NC, and London, ENG. (2007). .
  Discussion of Dillon's rule, charter cities and home rule in New Mexico.

External links 
 California State Constitution, Article 11: Local government

Economic development in the United States
Forms of local government
Local government in the United States
Types of administrative division